Cornelia Paczka-Wagner' (1864-after 1930) was a German artist.

Biography 
Paczka-Wagner née Wagner was born on 9 August 1864 in Göttingen. She attended the Königliche Akademie der Bildenden Kunste (Academy of Fine Arts, Munich) and studied with Karl Stauffer-Bern. She traveled to Rome to continue her studies, and there she met the Hungarian painter , who she married in Rome in 1890. The couple settled in Berlin. Paczka-Wagner won a bronze medal at the Paris Exposition Universelle (1889).

Sources do not have an exact date of death for Paczka-Wagner. It is stated as either "1930" or "after 1930". The Deutsche Biographie lists her death date as 1943.

Gallery

References

External links

1864 births
1930 deaths
Artists from Göttingen
20th-century German women artists